The 2nd NWHL All-Star Game took place at the UPMC Lemieux Sports Complex on February 12, 2017 in Pittsburgh, Pennsylvania. A skills competition was held the day prior on February 11, 2017. 
   
This edition of the All-Star Game featured a "fantasy draft" format in order to determine the rosters. The team captains were Amanda Kessel from the New York Riveters, and forward Kelley Steadman, who was the MVP of the 2016 NWHL All-Star Game, from the Buffalo Beauts.

Selected players

Fan voting
Over 20,000 votes were cast in order to select four more players to add to the All-Star Game rosters.

Media selection
A group of NWHL reporters were given the ability to choose two players to attend the All-Star Game on 6 January 2016.

Rosters

Game summary
The All-Star Game started with a 3-2 lead for Team Kessel, as they emerged victorious in the Skills Competition held on February 10, 2017, which saw both teams compete in a series of five skills events. A pair of twenty-five minute periods was staged at the All-Star Game, rather than the traditional format of three twenty-minute periods.

In the first period, Team Steadman scored the first goal, as Brianna Decker scored against Team Kessel goaltender Brittany Ott. Rookie Alexandra Carpenter was credited with the assist on Decker’s goal, as the score was now tied 3-3.

Kessel would score an unassisted goal on Team Steadman goaltender Brianne McLaughlin to reclaim the lead. Before the period would expire, a total of 10 goals were scored, with Team Kessel claiming an 8-7 lead.

Goals for Team Kessel were scored by Megan Bozek, Rebecca Russo and Harrison Browne, while Kessel scored another. Madison Packer would score twice for Team Steadman. Other Team Steadman scorers in the first included Emily Pfalzer and Kelly Babstock, the first (and only) Canadian-born player to score a goal in the game.

The second period saw Katie Fitzgerald between the pipes for Team Steadman, while Nicole Stock guarded the crease for Team Kessel. Harrison Browne would score another goal, while Hilary Knight also added her name to the scoresheet.

Team Steadman’s other scorers in the second period included Haley Skarupa, Carpenter and Steadman. Of note, Steadman would score to tie the game at 10-apiece. An empty net goal by Kessel would win the game for her team, as she recorded the first hat trick in NWHL All-Star Game history. For her efforts, she was recognized as the Game’s Most Valuable Player.

Skills competition
Fastest skater: Rebecca Russo
Hardest shot: Blake Bolden
Shooting accuracy: Kelley Steadman

References 

2017 National Womens Hockey League All-Star Game
2017 in ice hockey
2017 in sports in Pennsylvania
2016–17 in American women's ice hockey
2016–17 NWHL season
Premier Hockey Federation All-Star Games